Shi Shouxin (928–984) was a military general in imperial China, first serving the Later Zhou during the last years of the Five Dynasties and Ten Kingdoms period, and later the Song Dynasty.

Career under Later Zhou
Shi Shouxin first followed Guo Wei who founded the Later Zhou in 951. During Guo's early reign, Shi became an inspector-in-chief of the imperial guard. After the Battle of Gaoping against the Northern Han in 954, Shi was promoted to first commandant of the left imperial guard. After the siege of Taiyuan he was promoted to left and right commandant of the cavalry.

Career under Song
After Later Zhou was overthrown by the Song Dynasty, Emperor Taizu of Song made him a jiedushi. Later, he and Gao Huaide defeated Li Yun's rebellion, and he ordered the thousands of surrendered soldiers all executed. He also defeated Li Chongjin's rebellion.

References

Sources
  

928 births
984 deaths
Later Zhou jiedushi of Yicheng Circuit
Song dynasty generals
Song dynasty jiedushi
Politicians from Kaifeng
Generals from Henan
Song dynasty politicians from Henan